A Mauritian is a person from Mauritius, an island nation off the coast of the African continent in the southwest Indian Ocean.

Mauritian may also refer to:

 Mauritian Creole, a French-based creole language spoken in Mauritius
 Mauritian League, the top division of the Mauritius Football Association
 Mauritian Cup, the top knockout tournament of Mauritian football
 Mauritian Labour Party, a major political party in Mauritius
 Mauritian duck (Anas theodori), a bird
 The Mauritian Wildlife Foundation, a non-governmental, non-profit conservation agency
 Mauritian dollar

See also 
 
 Culture of Mauritius
 List of Mauritians

Language and nationality disambiguation pages